= Speed limits in Zimbabwe =

The speed limits in Zimbabwe are as follows:

| National limit - wide tar (light vehicles) | 120 km/h (75 mph) | National limit - wide tar (Public service vehicles and heavy vehicles) | 80 km/h (50 mph) |
| Roads other than wide tar (light vehicles) | 80 km/h (50 mph) | Roads other than wide tar (public service vehicles and heavy vehicles) | 60 km/h (37 mph) |
| Urban areas general limit (light vehicles) | 60 km/h (37 mph) | Urban areas specific limit (public service vehicles and heavy vehicles) | 60 km/h (37 mph) |
| Urban areas range (light vehicles) | 50–80 km/h (31–50 mph) | Construction vehicles, tractors and vehicles drawing more than one trailer | 40 km/h (25 mph) |

Fines are charged for excess speed of 6–49 km/h (3.7–30.4 mph) above the applicable limit and speeding at 50 km/h (31 mph) or more above the applicable limit results in a court appearance.

The categorisation wide tar refers to asphalt concrete-surfaced roads with at least two lanes (one lane in each direction).
